Al-Humazah (: "The Backbiter", "The Slanderer", or "The Scorner") is the 104th chapter (sūrah) of the Qur'an, with 9 āyāt or verses. 
۝ Woe to every backbiter, slanderer,
۝ who amasses wealth ˹greedily˺ and counts it ˹repeatedly˺,
۝ thinking that their wealth will make them immortal!
۝ Not at all! Such a person will certainly be tossed into the Crusher.
۝ And what will make you realize what the Crusher is?
۝ ˹It is˺ Allah’s kindled Fire,
۝ which rages over the hearts.
۝ It will be sealed over them,
۝ ˹tightly secured˺ with long braces.

The Surah takes its name from the word humazah occurring in the first verse. The main statement  in this surah is the Consequences of man in loss. It condemns those who slander others, whether by speech or action, and imagine that their own wealth will keep them immune from death, and describes the doom of Hell which awaits them.

Regarding the timing and contextual background of the revelation (asbāb al-nuzūl), it is an earlier "Meccan surah", which means it is believed to have been revealed in Mecca, rather than later in Medina.

Summary
 	1-4 Woes pronounced on slanderers and backbiters
 	5-9  Al Hutama described

Text and meaning

Text and transliteration

Warsh from Nafiʽ al-Madani

Translation

Woe to every scorner and mocker

Who collects wealth and [continuously] counts it.

He thinks that his wealth will make him immortal.

No! He will surely be thrown into the Crusher.

And what can make you know what is the Crusher?

Which mounts directed at the hearts.

Indeed, Hellfire will be closed down upon them

In extended columns.

Overview

In the phrase "slandering traducer" (Arabic: humaza lumaza), according to Ibn Kathir, the first word refers to slandering by speech, and the second to slander by action (though he also quotes Mujahid as saying the opposite: "Al-Humazah is with the hand and the eye, and Al-Lumazah is with the tongue.") The "fire ... which leapeth over the hearts" is sometimes interpreted as starting below and rising: according to Ibn Kathir, Muhammad bin Ka`b said that "it (the Fire) will devour every part of his body until it reaches his heart and comes to the level of his throat, then it will return to his body."  The "columns" described in the final verse are interpreted as columns of fire by some authorities (e.g. As-Sudd), as in the translation above, but as literal pillars of iron by some others (e.g. Al-Awfi).

Surah Humazah tells how bad mankind can get into loss, and this is why some scholars state that there is no severer description given of hell in the Quran than the description given in this surah. Many severe and harsh descriptions of hell are mentioned throughout the Quran, however this Surah is especially unique, as Allah says about hell what He has not said in other Surahs: “Naarullah” ((the) Fire (of) Allah!).

In other surahs, Allah says “Naaru Jahannam” (Fire of Hell) etc. But when the fire is attributed to God, it's more than that, it's a fire lit by Allah Himself for those who opposed Him.

This is the last surah in the Quran which discusses the Akhirah (after life), and the surahs after this do not discuss the Akhirah afterlife again.

Theme and subject matter
وما ادراک مالحطمہ۔(الھمزہ 104 القران)
The wise Qur'an said. "Atomic destruction is indescribably horrible and indescribably complex." The horror of the atomic bomb needs no explanation, and as far as the subject of nuclear science is concerned, its difficulties and complications are indescribable.
		(Allama Muhammad Yousuf Gabriel)
In it some of the evils prevalent among the materialistic hoarders of wealth in the pre-Islamic days have been condemned. Every Arab knew that these vices, actually existed in their society; they regarded them as evils and nobody thought they were good. After calling attention to this kind of ugly character, the ultimate end in the Hereafter of the people having this kind of character has been stated. Both these things (i.e. the character and his fate in the Hereafter) have been depicted in a way which makes the listener automatically reach the conclusion that such a man fitly deserves to meet such an end. And since in the world, people of such character do not suffer any punishment, but seem to be thriving instead, the occurrence of the Hereafter becomes absolutely inevitable.

The name of the Surah is derived from the verb "humaza" occurring in the first verse. Together with "lumaza" which follows it. The theme of the verse is set as involving the condemnation of mockery. This mockery is themed on the actions of the unbelievers of the time towards the early Muslim believers. Humaza meaning the mockery coming from the hands and eye, and lumaza the mockery from the tongue; refers in a much broader way to mockery done in all manner of ways great or small, obvious or veiled, loud or soft and so on. The construct encompasses all forms of mockery designed to belittle the other and ingratiate the self. This can be related as the great sin of Iblis (Satan) as when he mocks God's creation of Adam in describing His creation as being mere mud and unworthy of any respect.

It then deals in the second verse with the accumulation of money and wealth. In these verses it is not the mere honest earning of wealth that is meant, it is the completely inconsiderate accumulation of wealth without any concern given to its origin or means of acquisition. No regard is given to whether the wealth belongs properly to someone else, or whether any others have a share in it. Whether it comes from legitimate or illegal business. In effect it is the blind accumulation of wealth for wealth's sake to enrich only the avarice of the ones guilty of this sin. This is furthered by the fact that those focused on this behaviour continuously dwell upon the amount of their ill gotten hoard and take pleasure in stacking it up and so on.

The third verse amplifies the sin of heedless accumulation of wealth by stating that those with such attitudes believe it will protect them and sustain them in this world and also in the hereafter. That the wealth will buy them protection and sustenance in perpetuity. The second and third verses are implicitly cited as the cause of the increased self-importance, pride and haughtiness of those who mock others.

If this Surah is read in the sequence of the Surahs beginning with al-Zalzala, one can fully well understand how the fundamental beliefs of Islam and its teachings were impressed on the peoples minds in the earliest stage in Makkah. In Surah Az-Zilzal, it was said that in the Hereafter man's full record will be placed before him and not an atom's weight of good or evil done by him in the world will have been left unrecorded. In Surah Al-Adiyatt, attention was drawn to the plunder and loot, bloodshed and vandalism, prevailing in Arabia before Islam; then making the people realize, that the way the powers given by God were being abused, was indeed an expression of sheer ingratitude to Him, they were told that the matter would not end up in the world, but in the second life after death not only their deeds but their intentions and motives too would be examined, and their Lord fully well knows which of them deserves what reward or punishment. In Surah Al-Qaria after depicting Resurrection the people were warned that in the Hereafter a man's good or evil end will be dependent on whether the scale of his good deeds was heavier, or the scale of his evil deeds was heavier:In Surah At-Takathur the people were taken to task for the materialistic mentality because of which they remained occupied in seeking increase in worldly benefits, pleasures, comforts and position, and in vying with one another for abundance of everything until death overtook them. Then, warning them of the evil consequences of their heedlessness, they were told that the world was not an open table of food for then to pick and choose whatever they pleased, but for every single blessing that they were enjoying in the world, they would have to render an account to their Lord and Sustainer as to how they obtained it and how they used it. In Surah Al-Asr it was declared that each member, each group and each community of mankind, even the entire world of humanity, was in manifest loss, if its members were devoid of Faith and righteous deeds and of the practice of exhorting others to truth and patience. Immediately after this comes Surah Al-Humazah in which after presenting a specimen of leadership of the pre-Islamic age of ignorance, the people have been asked the question: "What should such a character deserve if not loss and perdition?"

References

External links
Quran 104 Clear Quran translation

Humaza